The American St. Leger Stakes is a discontinued Grade 3 flat horse race in the United States for thoroughbreds three-year-old and older. Held annually in mid August, it was held on the same racecard as the Arlington Million, Beverly D. Stakes and Secretariat Stakes and on the same turf course at Arlington Park, Arlington Heights, Illinois.

The race was upgraded to Grade 3 status in 2015. It was dropped from Arlington Park's calendar in 2018.

Winners

References 

Discontinued horse races
Arlington Park
Turf races in the United States
Horse races in Illinois
2012 establishments in Illinois
2018 disestablishments in Illinois
Open long distance horse races